Pierre Alexandre Jean Mollière (1800 – 6 July 1850) was a French general.

1800 births
1850 deaths
19th-century French writers
French generals
French philhellenes
French male writers
19th-century French male writers